The word Rubeus may refer to one of the following.

In fiction
 Rubeus Hagrid; a half-wizard, half-giant serving as a Hogwarts teacher in the Harry Potter novels and films
 Crimson Rubeus; a character in the Sailor Moon metaseries

In reality, myth, and religion
 Rubeus; reference as a Tarrot card, mind reading, Rubeus (geomancy) figures and Zodiac sign characters